Myer Creek is a tributary ephemeral stream running east through the In-Ko-Pah Gorge in the Jacumba Mountains, then as a wash in the Yuha Desert, to Coyote Wash in Imperial County, California. Its mouth is located at an elevation of  where it usually sinks into the sands before reaching Coyote Wash near Ocotillo, California.

References

Rivers of Imperial County, California
Rivers of Southern California